Karapa Mandal is one of the 21 mandals in Kakinada District of Andhra Pradesh. As per census 2011, there are 19 villages.

Demographics 
Karapa Mandal has total population of 76,398 as per the Census 2011 out of which 38,460 are males while 37,938 are females and the average Sex Ratio of Karapa Mandal is 986. The total literacy rate of Karapa Mandal is 68.61%. The male literacy rate is 63.59% and the female literacy rate is 58.76%.

Towns and villages

Villages 
pedakotturu
vijayarayudupalem
valasapakala
uppalanka
goddatipalem
Aratlakatta
China Mamidada
G. Bhavaram
Gorripudi
Gurajanapalle
Karapa
Kongodu
Koripalle
Kurada
Nadakuduru
Patharlagadda
Peddapurapadu
Penuguduru
Siripuram
Vakada
Velangi
Vemulavada
Yandamuru
Z. Bhavaram

See also 
List of mandals in Andhra Pradesh

References 

Mandals in Kakinada district
Mandals in Andhra Pradesh